The Coraya wren (Pheugopedius coraya) is a species of bird in the family Troglodytidae, the wrens.

Distribution and habitat
It is found in Amazonian northern and northwestern South America, the northern Amazon Basin and the Guianas, of Guyana, French Guiana, Suriname, and Amazonian southeast Colombia, eastern Ecuador, and north and central Peru; also the southeastern Orinoco River Basin of Venezuela.  Its natural habitats are subtropical or tropical moist lowland forests, subtropical or tropical swamps, and heavily degraded former forest.

Range: northern Amazon Basin with the Guianas
Besides the northern Amazon Basin and the Guianas including the Guiana Highlands, the contiguous range in the southeastern Amazon Basin extends to Maranhão state Brazil, and covers the downstream third of the three north-flowing river systems: the Tapajós River, Xingu River, and the Araguaia-Tocantins River system; in the Andean west, in central Peru, the range extends southward, upstream 1300 km into the Ucayali River drainage region of central Peru.

The two non-Amazon Basin areas are the Caribbean Orinoco River of Venezuela, (in the southeast), and the north-flowing Atlantic areas of the Guianas. The Coraya wren can be found on Ilha de Marajo at the Amazon River's outlet.

Description
It is a medium-sized wren, rufous-(chestnut)-brown overall with a medium length black-and-white banded tail. It has a buff white breast, white throat and an overall black head, flecked with white feathers; notably a narrow upper bright white eye stripe, and a narrow white eye ring of white feathers. It has a medium length black decurved bill, black eyes, and gray-black legs. It is darker brown on its back, deep brown-blackish wings, and lighter buff brown on its sides.

References

 BirdLife International 2004.  Thryothorus coraya.   2006 IUCN Red List of Threatened Species.   Downloaded on 27 July 2007.

External links
Coraya Wren videos on the Internet Bird Collection
Coraya Wren photo gallery VIREO Photo-High Res
Photo-High Res; Article oiseaux

Coraya wren
Birds of the Amazon Basin
Birds of the Guianas
Birds of the Colombian Amazon
Birds of the Venezuelan Amazon
Birds of the Ecuadorian Amazon
Birds of the Peruvian Amazon
Coraya wren
Coraya wren
Birds of Brazil
Taxonomy articles created by Polbot